Ralph Mitchell Siegel, a researcher who studied the neurological underpinnings of vision, was a professor of neuroscience at Rutgers University, Newark, in the Center for Molecular and Behavioral Neuroscience. He died September 2, 2011 at his home following a long illness.

Siegel, a neurophysiologist, was interested in the basic mechanisms underlying visual motion and spatial perception, with the ultimate goal of developing applications to assist people who have visual processing disorders and neurological injuries. He performed pioneering work on parietal neurons and the influence of eye position and attention on perception. His laboratory became the first to perform optical imaging of parietal cortex in behaving non-human primates.

Biography

Siegel earned his B.S. in physics and his Ph.D. in physiology from McGill University in Montreal. Ralph's 1984 Ph.D. thesis in the lab of Richard I. Birks revealed astonishingly large and long-lasting potassium conductance and sodium pump driven voltage changes that occur following bursts of action potentials in thin axons that model presynaptic nerve terminals. After completing his graduate studies at McGill on theoretical neuroscience of spiking behaviour in neural dendrites, Ralph moved to the Salk Institute where he began to focus on in vivo, behavioral neurophysiology of monkeys. Ralph was at the forefront of experimental studies to understand the neurophysiology of cognitive processes in primates in the early 1980s. He was a co-discoverer of the gain-field mechanisms of neuronal population encoding, and employed precise psychophysical methods to understand visual motion perception at the level of neuronal activity.

In 1987 Ralph began a postdoctoral position in the laboratory of Nobel Prize winner, Torsten Wiesel, at Rockefeller University.  While at Rockefeller, Ralph nurtured a latent interest in theoretical studies of cortical visual processing and the rapidly emerging field of optical imaging of cortex, through collaboration with a pioneering group led by Amiram Grinvald. Ralph then moved to the lab of Richard Andersen at the Salk Institute as a postdoctoral fellow where became a co-discoverer of the gain-field mechanisms of neuronal population encoding, and began the work that he continued throughout his career in employing precise psychophysical and physiological methods to understand visual motion perception at the level of neuronal activity.

In 1991 Ralph moved to the newly established Rutgers Center for Molecular and Behavioral Neuroscience where he was on the faculty for the remainder of his career. Ralph maintained his scientific collaborations with his former colleagues at the Salk Institute, making annual summer visits to La Jolla. During this period, he continued his pioneering neurophysiological and behavioral work on the organization and functions of visual cortex in the parietal lobe and continued to develop the use of optical microscopic techniques to monitor neuronal activity in the cerebral cortex. In collaboration with the Salk Institute's Ed Callaway (head of the Callaway Lab for the study of the organization and function of cortical circuits) and UC Berkeley's Ehud Isacoff (whom Ralph trained in the Birks lab at McGill, leading to a lasting friendship), Ralph began to develop tools that enabled optical monitoring of activity from neurons in behaving animals.

In 2012 Siegel's first book and memoir, Another Day in the Monkey's Brain, was published, by Oxford University Press, with the help of his lifelong friend and colleague, Dr. Oliver Sacks. Sacks described his interactions with Ralph in his 2005 obituary for Francis Crick and in a video interview and dedicated his 2007 book Musicophilia: Tales of Music and the Brain to Ralph (along with Orrin Devinsky and Connie Tomaino).

Upon his death Ralph Siegel was survived by his wife Jasmine, son Dashiel, daughter Zoe, sister Cheryl, and mother Elaine.

Selected publications
 with R. A. Andersen and G. K. Essick: 
 with R. A. Andersen and G. K. Essick: 
 with R. A. Andersen: 
 
 with R. A. Andersen: 
 with A. Grinvald, R. D. Frostig, and E. Bartfeld: 
 with Charles Tresser and George Zettler: 
 with Gábor Jandó, Zsolt Horváth, and György Buzsáki: 
 with Heather L. Read: 
 with Malvin C. Teich and Robert G. Turcott:  
 with H. L. Read: 
 with H. L. Read: 
 
 with Kathleen C. Anderson: 
 with Raymond E. Phinney: 
 with H. L. Read: 
  (See Béla Julesz.)
 with Milena Raffi: 
 with E. M. Callaway: 
 with Oliver Sacks: 
 with Jeng-Ren Duann, Tzyy-Ping Jung, and Terrence Sejnowski: 
 with Nirmala Ramalingam, Barbara Heider, and Anushree P. Karnik: 
 with Milena Raffi: 
 with Barbara Heider, Jason L. Nathanson, Ehud Y. Isacoff, and Edward M. Callaway: 
 with Kurt F. Ahrens, Barbara Heider, Hanson Lee, and Ehud Y. Isacoff:

References

Rutgers University faculty
McGill University Faculty of Science alumni
1958 births
2011 deaths
Vision scientists